Assiah (also 'Asiya' or 'Asiyah, also known as Olam Asiyah, עוֹלָם עֲשִׂיָּה‎ in Hebrew, literally "the World of Action" and Aishah in Arabic) is the last of the four spiritual worlds of the Kabbalah —Atziluth, Beriah, Yetzirah, 'Asiyah— based on the passage in . It is identical with the existing world that we live in.

According to the Maseket Aẓilut, it is the region where the Ofanim rule and where they promote the hearing of prayers, support human endeavor, and combat evil. Their ruler is Sandalphon. According to the system of the later Land of Israel Kabbalah, 'Asiyah is the lowest of the spiritual worlds containing the Ten Heavens and the whole system of mundane Creation. The light of the Sefirot emanates from these Ten Heavens, which are called the "Ten Sefirot of 'Asiyah"; and through them spirituality and piety are imparted to the realm of matter—the seat of the dark and impure powers.

Representing purely material existence, it is known as the World of Action, the World of Effects or the World of Making. In western occultism it is associated with the Suit of Pentacles (or Coins or Disks, the terminology varies according to the deck) in the Tarot. The world of Yetzirah precedes it.

Correspondences
 The final letter hei ה in the Tetragrammaton
 The sefirah of Malchut and hence the partzuf of Nukvah
 The element of Earth
 The soul-level of nefesh
 The soul-garment of action
 The mouth (Patach Eliyahu)
 The Oral Torah tradition (Patach Eliyahu)
 The Shechinah
 The Birkat HaShachar and the order of the Korbanot in the Shacharit prayer service
 In the allegory of the teacher and the student, the final stage where the student comprehends the teacher's lesson, expanding the compressed information to its full breadth
 The fixed, earth, sign of Taurus (astrology).

Notes

References

Four Worlds
Kabbalistic words and phrases